Raffi Aghasi Boghosyan (born 29 January 1993), also known simply as Raffi or Rafi, is a Bulgarian singer and percussions player of Armenian origin who won the first ever Bulgarian X Factor on the final held on 11 December 2011. He won a contract with Virginia Records and the chance to record a single with a foreign composer and producer in a studio outside Bulgaria.

Boghosyan was born in Burgas to Aghasi and Elizabeth Bohosyan, both Armenians. He studied in Business in Burgas majoring in Economics and Management. He is a self-taught percussion player. He is also interested in photography, martial arts and activities and is the President of "Младежки глас" (Youth Voice) Cultural Association.

Singles and videography
(In parenthesis, peak positions on Bulgarian Top 40)
2012: "4-3-2-1" (BUL: #2)
2013: "Ne me razbra" (in Bulgarian "Не ме разбра") (BUL: #27)
2016: "Nameri me" (in Bulgarian "Намери ме)  (Find me))

Collaborations
2013: "4D" (Deo, Leo, Raffi & Igrata)
2014: "Nali taka" (Raffi & Hoodini)
2014: "V Nashija film" (with Deo featuring Leo, Raffi and Igrata) 
2014: "Mr. Comandante" (Raffi featuring Deo, Leo and Igrata)
2015: "Nov Den (New Day)" (Raffi feat. REWIND)

References

External links
Facebook
YouTube
Instagram

21st-century Bulgarian male singers
The X Factor winners
1993 births
Living people
Musicians from Burgas
Bulgarian people of Armenian descent
X Factor (Bulgarian TV series)